Ormond Graham (31 May 1918 – 18 January 1989) was a Barbadian cricketer. He played in two first-class matches for the Barbados cricket team in 1942/43.

See also
 List of Barbadian representative cricketers

References

External links
 

1918 births
1989 deaths
Barbadian cricketers
Barbados cricketers
People from Saint Michael, Barbados